Ziad Tarek Mohamed Farag (born 6 September  2000) is an Egyptian professional footballer who plays as a winger for Smouha (on loan from Al Ahly).

Career statistics

Club

Notes

Honours
Al Ahly
FIFA Club World Cup:Third-Place 2021

References

2000 births
Living people
Footballers from Cairo
Egyptian footballers
Association football midfielders
Egyptian Premier League players
Al Ahly SC players
Ismaily SC players